Good Intent is an unincorporated community in Atchison County, Kansas, United States.

History
A post office was opened in Good Intent in 1872, and remained in operation until it was discontinued in 1900.

References

Further reading

External links
 Atchison County maps: Current, Historic, KDOT

Unincorporated communities in Atchison County, Kansas
Unincorporated communities in Kansas
1872 establishments in Kansas
Populated places established in 1872